Atlas Vending is the fourth studio album by Canadian punk rock band METZ. It was released on October 9, 2020 via Sub Pop Records. Production was handled by Ben Greenberg and METZ.

Critical reception

Atlas Vending was met with generally favorable reviews from music critics. At Metacritic, which assigns a normalized rating out of 100 to reviews from mainstream publications, the album received an average score of 80 based on twelve reviews. The aggregator AnyDecentMusic? has the critical consensus of the album at a 7.6 out of 10, based on fourteen reviews.

Track listing

Personnel
Alex Edkins – lyrics, vocals, guitar, songwriter, producer, additional recording, design, layout
Chris Slorach – bass, songwriter, producer, design, layout
Hayden Menzies – drums, songwriter, producer, design, layout
Ben Greenberg – producer
Seth Manchester – engineering, mixing
Matt Colton – mastering
David Konopka – design, layout
Jeff Kleinsmith – cover design
John Edkins – cover photography
Nicholas Sayers – additional photography

Charts

References

External links

2020 albums
Metz (band) albums
Sub Pop albums